Milionia fulgida is a species of day-flying moth in the family Geometridae. The species was  first described by Vollenhoven in 1863. It is found on Java and Borneo. Adults are distinguished by the lack of any orange marking on the hindwings.

References 

 
 

Ennominae
Moths described in 1863
Moths of Indonesia